The 1946–47 Divizia A was the thirtieth season of Divizia A, the top-level football league of Romania.

Teams

League table

Results

Results by round

Top goalscorers

Champion squad

See also 

 1946–47 Divizia B

References

Liga I seasons
Romania
1946–47 in Romanian football